Scelio punctaticeps is a species of parasitoid wasp in the subfamily, Scelioninae, and was first described in 1914 by Alan Parkhurst Dodd.

The holotype was collected in Cairns, Queensland.

References

Taxa described in 1914
Taxa named by Alan Parkhurst Dodd